Synersaga breviclavata is a moth in the family Lecithoceridae. It is found in China (Shaanxi).

References

Moths described in 2014
breviclavata
Moths of Asia